The Supreme Council, Ancient and Accepted Scottish Rite, Southern Jurisdiction, USA (commonly known as the Mother Supreme Council of the World) was the first Supreme Council of Scottish Rite Freemasonry. It claims that all other Supreme Councils and Subordinate Bodies of the Scottish Rite are derived from it.  Its official full name is "The Supreme Council (Mother Council of the World) of the Inspectors General Knights Commander of the House of the Temple of Solomon of the Thirty-third Degree of the Ancient and Accepted Scottish Rite of Freemasonry of the Southern Jurisdiction of the United States of America."  It is also commonly known as The Supreme Council, 33°, Southern Jurisdiction, or by some other varying degree of complete titulage.  It is the governing body of Scottish Rite Freemasonry in its jurisdiction, and is one of two Supreme Councils in the United States. It oversees the Scottish Rite in 35 states (the other states fall within the Northern Jurisdiction, which is an independent body).

The Scottish Rite is one of the appendant bodies of Freemasonry that a Master Mason may join for further exposure to the principles of Freemasonry.  To join the Supreme Council, one must attain the 32° of the Scottish Rite, and then be conferred the honorary 33°.

In the Southern Jurisdiction of the United States, the Supreme Council consists of no more than 33 members, and is presided over by a Grand Commander. Other members of the Supreme Council are called "Sovereign Grand Inspectors General" (S.G.I.G.), and each is the head of the Rite in his respective Orient (or state). Other heads of the various Orients who are not members of the Supreme Council are called "Deputies of the Supreme Council."

The first philosophical document of the Mother Supreme Council of the World was "Morals and Dogma of the Ancient and Accepted Scottish Rite of Freemasonry," written by Albert Pike (Sovereign Grand Commander of the Scottish Rite's Southern Jurisdiction; head of the Mother Supreme Council of the World) in 1872.  A copy of Morals & Dogma was given to every new member in the Southern Jurisdiction until 1974, when it was deemed "too advanced to be helpful to the new Scottish Rite member."  The book given to new initiates then became Grand Commander Henry C. Clausen's Clausen's Commentaries On Morals and Dogma (1976), then Rex Hutchens' A Bridge to Light (1988). Following the adoption of the "Revised Standard Pike Ritual," Hutchens' book was revised in 2010 by Scottish Rite Grand Archivist and Grand Historian Arturo de Hoyos, and is still available. However de Hoyos' Scottish Rite Ritual Monitor  and Guide (2007, rev. 2010), is now distributed, as is also Albert Pike's Morals and Dogma: Annotated Edition (2011), also by Grand Archivist and Grand Historian de Hoyos.

History 
The Supreme Council was founded in Charleston, South Carolina in 1801. In 1911 the Mother Supreme Council began construction of a national headquarters of the Supreme Council in the District of Columbia, called the House of the Temple.  Finished in 1915, the House of the Temple remains their headquarters to this day.  It is located at 1733 Sixteenth Street, NW.  The House of the Temple also contains the remains of Albert Pike, the author of Morals and Dogma.

In 1813, a member of the Supreme Council established in New York a Supreme Council for the Northern Jurisdiction of the United States of America.  In 1823, the Supreme Council granted jurisdiction of the fifteen states east of the Mississippi River and north of the Ohio River to the Supreme Council for the Northern Jurisdiction.

Other 
The Supreme Council in 1928 made a gift of $1 million to the George Washington University in D.C., to fund the creation of a School of Business.

Sovereign Grand Commanders

1801-1816: John Mitchell
1816-1822: Frederick Dalcho
1822-1826: Isaac Auld
1826-1844: Moses Holbrook
1844-1845: Jacob De La Motta (acting)
1845-1846: Alexander McDonald
1846-1858: John H. Honour
1858-1859: Charles M. Furman (acting)
1859-1891: Albert Pike
1893-1893: James C. Batchelor
1893-1895: Philip C. Tucker
1895-1900: Thomas H. Caswell
1901-1914: James D. Richardson
1914-1921: George F. Moore
1921-1953: John H. Cowles
1952-1955: Thomas J. Harkms
1955-1969: Luther S. Smith
1969-1985: Henry C. Clausen
1985-2003: C. Fred Kleinknecht
2003-2019: Ronald A. Seale
2019-present: James D. Cole

References

External links 
"Scottish Rite Freemasonry" The Supreme Council, 33°, A.&A.S.R. of Freemasonry, S.J., USA (2008).
"Scottish Rite History" Orient of California (2008).
Scottish Rite Member Handbook (2016)

Masonic organizations
Organizations established in 1801